Dysorgasmia is the experience of a painful orgasm, usually in the abdomen. The condition may be experienced during or after orgasm, sometimes as late as several hours after the orgasm occurred. Both men and women can experience orgasmic pain. The term is sometimes used interchangeably with painful ejaculation when experienced by a man, but ejaculatory pain is only a subtype of male dysorgasmia as men can experience pain without ejaculating. The phenomenon is poorly understood and underresearched. Dysorgasmia can come as a side effect of surgical interventions such as prostatectomy.

See also
 Dyspareunia, pain during sex

References

Orgasm
Sexual dysfunctions
Pain